Ida Davidsen is a celebrated smørrebrød restaurant located in the heart of Copenhagen, Denmark. The restaurant is more than a century old and is considered a cultural institution in Denmark  with a menu of over 280 varieties of open-faced sandwiches. Popular among tourists and locals alike, Queen Margrethe II has also been known to have the restaurant cater royal events.  It is adjacent to the Kongens Nytorv square. It was also featured in a task on The Amazing Race 25.

References

External links 

Official Website
Frommer's Review
Travel Channel Copenhagen Tourism Article

Restaurants in Copenhagen
Restaurants in Denmark
Companies based in Copenhagen Municipality